Keitani Graham (February 1, 1980 — December 6, 2012) was a Micronesian Greco-Roman wrestler. He competed in the Greco-Roman 84 kg event at the 2012 Summer Olympics and was eliminated in the qualifications by Chas Betts.

Graham was born in Kealakekua, Hawaii and attended Punahou School in Honolulu and College of the Holy Cross in Worcester, Massachusetts. After college, he taught at Princess Ruth Ke’elikōlani Middle School. He died in Chuuk at the age of 32 after suffering a heart attack.

Achievements
Graham also competed successfully in combined events in track and field athletics.

References

External links
 
 

1980 births
2012 deaths
People from Hawaii (island)
Sportspeople from Hawaii
American people of Federated States of Micronesia descent
Federated States of Micronesia male sport wrestlers
Olympic wrestlers of the Federated States of Micronesia
Wrestlers at the 2012 Summer Olympics
Holy Cross Crusaders athletes
College men's track and field athletes in the United States